Judo competitions at the 2022 Commonwealth Games in Birmingham, England, were held from 1 to 3 August 2022. This was the fifth time the sport has been on the program, since it was introduced as a demonstration sport in 1986, and made official at the next edition in 1990. Its second appearance within England specifically, spread across fourteen weight categories.Unlike other international competitions where each country can only enter one athlete per weight. Each participating country can enter up to 2 participants per weight.The sport will give two bronze medals,one for the winner from repechage and another for the athlete who won the third place event.

It will be the only time that Judo will become a core sport at the Commonwealth Games, previously classified as an optional sport in three previous editions.

Schedule
The competition schedule is as follows:

Venue
The judo competitions was held at the Coventry Arena in Coventry. The wrestling competitions will also take place there, whilst the adjacent Coventry Stadium will play host to rugby sevens.

Medal summary

Medal table

Men

Women

Participating nations
There were 36 participating Commonwealth Games Associations (CGA's) in judo with a total of 160 (97 men and 63 women) athletes. The number of athletes a nation entered is in parentheses beside the name of the country.

References

External links
 Official website: 2022 Commonwealth Games – Judo
 
 Results Book – Judo (archived)

 
2022
2022 Commonwealth Games events
Judo in England
Judo competitions in the United Kingdom
Commonwealth Games